This is a list of ecoregions in Syria.

Terrestrial
Syria is in the Palearctic realm. Ecoregions are listed by biome.

Mediterranean forests, woodlands, and scrub
 Eastern Mediterranean conifer-broadleaf forests
 Southern Anatolian montane conifer and deciduous forests

Deserts and xeric shrublands
 Middle East steppe
 Mesopotamian shrub desert

Freshwater
 Arabian Interior
 Coastal Levant
 Jordan River
 Lower Tigris & Euphrates
 Orontes
 Upper Tigris & Euphrates

Marine
 Levantine Sea, part of the Mediterranean Sea marine province in the Temperate Northern Atlantic marine realm

Syria
 *
ecoregions